JC's is a formerly independent supermarket located in Swords, County Dublin, Ireland. The supermarket was purchased by Dunnes Stores in 2019 from the Savage family.

The supermarket was opened in 1977 by JC Savage, who died in 2010.

Actor Simon Bird was photographed shopping here in January 2015.

Satirist Dave Chambers, member of The Rubberbandits, is known to wear a JC's plastic shopping bag on his head.

The supermarket was a subject of the RTE show,  Feargal Quinn's Retail Therapy, hosted by the former Superquinn founder.

References

External links
 JC's

Supermarkets of the Republic of Ireland
Irish companies established in 1977
2019 disestablishments in Ireland